St. Louis is a municipality that holds community status in Prince Edward Island, Canada.

It is located in western Prince County, west of the junction of Route 155 and Route 152,  from Charlottetown, the provincial capital.

The community lies in the Egmont federal electoral district, and in the Tignish-Palmer Road and Alberton-Roseville provincial electoral districts.

Demographics 

Education 
St. Louis Elementary is the only school in the community. It is administered by the English Language School Board of Prince Edward Island. It offers English or French Immersion classes for students from St. Louis and other communities such as St.Edward, Miminegash, Pleasant View, Waterford, Palmer Road and DeBlois. It was the first school to offer French Immersion in the province.

See also 
List of communities in Prince Edward Island

References 

Communities in Prince County, Prince Edward Island
Rural municipalities in Prince Edward Island